This article lists all films, documentary films and specials produced for release on Paramount+, formerly known as CBS All Access, an American over-the-top subscription video on demand service owned and operated by Paramount Streaming, a division of Paramount Global.

Original films

Feature films

Documentaries

Specials

Upcoming original films

Feature films

Documentaries

Notes

References 

 
Paramount Global-related lists